Alumni Field was a multi-purpose stadium in Amherst, Massachusetts on the campus of the University of Massachusetts Amherst. It was home to the UMass Redmen football team from around 1879 to 1964, when it was replaced by Warren McGuirk Alumni Stadium in nearby Hadley. Today, the former location of the field is the location of the Philip F. Whitmore Administration Building.

References

External links
 Football timeline

Sports venues completed in 1879
American football venues in Massachusetts
UMass Minutemen football
Defunct multi-purpose stadiums in the United States
Buildings and structures in Amherst, Massachusetts
University of Massachusetts Amherst buildings
Defunct college football venues
1879 establishments in Massachusetts
1965 disestablishments in Massachusetts
Sports venues demolished in 1965
University and college buildings completed in 1879
Sports in Amherst, Massachusetts